Philippe Ebly (July 29, 1920 - March 1, 2014) was a Belgian science-fiction and fantasy writer born in Paris (France) and died in Liège.

Novel series 
The Fantastic Conquerors Series (Les Conquérants de l'Impossible)
The Time Runaways Series (Les évadés du Temps)
The 4003 Patrol Series (Les Patrouilleurs de l'an 4003)

Publishing houses 
French publishing houses
La Bibliothèque Verte (Hachette)
Les éditions Degliame
Temps Impossibles
Belgian publishing house
Les éditions Averbodes
Les éditions Luc Pire

References

External links 
 http://www.philippe-ebly.net/
 http://www.tempsimpossible.com/ the new Philippe Ebly's editor.

1920 births
2014 deaths
Belgian writers in French
Belgian science fiction writers
French emigrants to Belgium